The Lebanese Republic and the Republic of India established diplomatic relations in 1954. Lebanon maintains an embassy in New Delhi, while India maintains one in Beirut.

Indian community in Lebanon
In 2006, the Indian population in Lebanon declined due to the Israel-Hezbollah War. Evacuees were first brought by Indian naval ships from the Lebanese capital of Beirut to Larnaca in Cyprus and then flown to India, under an Indian military-coordinated exercise dubbed as "Operation Sukoon."

References

 
Lebanon
Bilateral relations of Lebanon